The modern pentathlon at the 1968 Summer Olympics was represented by two events (both for men): Individual competition and Team competition. As usual in Olympic modern pentathlon, one competition was held and each competitor's score was included to the Individual competition event results table and was also added to his teammates' scores to be included to the Team competition event results table. This competition consisted of 5 disciplines:

Equestrian, held on October 13
Fencing, held on October 14
Shooting, held on October 15
Swimming, held on October 16
Cross-country, held on October 17

Medal summary

Medal table

Participating nations
A total of 48 athletes from 18 nations competed at the Mexico Games:

References

External links
Official Olympic Report

 
1968 Summer Olympics events
1968 in modern pentathlon